Douglas Hung (born 13 March 1936) is a Taiwanese politician.

Hung earned a bachelor's and master's degree in diplomacy from National Chengchi University. He settled in San Francisco, where he was involved in several Taiwanese cultural and economic associations. Hung was also an administrator at Lincoln University. He soon began working for the Ministry of Foreign Affairs in San Francisco, and was subsequently appointed to the Overseas Chinese Affairs Commission. Hung returned to Taiwan to serve on the presidium of the second National Assembly, and was also a member of the Kuomintang's overseas residents and diplomacy committee. He was elected to the Legislative Yuan in 1998 as a Kuomintang-affiliated representative of Overseas Chinese. During his tenure on the fourth Legislative Yuan, Hung maintained an interest in the foreign relations of Taiwan.

References

Politicians of the Republic of China on Taiwan from Changhua County
Party List Members of the Legislative Yuan
Kuomintang Members of the Legislative Yuan in Taiwan
Members of the 4th Legislative Yuan
1936 births
Living people
Taiwanese expatriates in the United States
National Chengchi University alumni
Taiwanese academic administrators